The arrondissement of Lunéville is an arrondissement of France in the Meurthe-et-Moselle department in the Grand Est region. It has 164 communes.

Composition

The communes of the arrondissement of Lunéville, and their INSEE codes, are:

 Amenoncourt (54013)
 Ancerviller (54014)
 Angomont (54017)
 Anthelupt (54020)
 Arracourt (54023)
 Athienville (54026)
 Autrepierre (54030)
 Avricourt (54035)
 Azerailles (54038)
 Baccarat (54039)
 Badonviller (54040)
 Barbas (54044)
 Barbonville (54045)
 Bathelémont (54050)
 Bauzemont (54053)
 Bayon (54054)
 Bénaménil (54061)
 Bertrambois (54064)
 Bertrichamps (54065)
 Bezange-la-Grande (54071)
 Bienville-la-Petite (54074)
 Bionville (54075)
 Blainville-sur-l'Eau (54076)
 Blâmont (54077)
 Blémerey (54078)
 Bonviller (54083)
 Borville (54085)
 Bréménil (54097)
 Brémoncourt (54098)
 Brouville (54101)
 Bures (54106)
 Buriville (54107)
 Chanteheux (54116)
 Charmois (54121)
 Chazelles-sur-Albe (54124)
 Chenevières (54125)
 Cirey-sur-Vezouze (54129)
 Clayeures (54130)
 Coincourt (54133)
 Courbesseaux (54139)
 Crévic (54145)
 Crion (54147)
 Croismare (54148)
 Damelevières (54152)
 Deneuvre (54154)
 Deuxville (54155)
 Domèvre-sur-Vezouze (54161)
 Domjevin (54163)
 Domptail-en-l'Air (54170)
 Drouville (54173)
 Einvaux (54175)
 Einville-au-Jard (54176)
 Emberménil (54177)
 Essey-la-Côte (54183)
 Fenneviller (54191)
 Flainval (54195)
 Flin (54199)
 Fontenoy-la-Joûte (54201)
 Fraimbois (54206)
 Franconville (54209)
 Fréménil (54210)
 Frémonville (54211)
 Froville (54216)
 Gélacourt (54217)
 Gerbéviller (54222)
 Giriviller (54228)
 Glonville (54229)
 Gogney (54230)
 Gondrexon (54233)
 Hablainville (54243)
 Haigneville (54245)
 Halloville (54246)
 Harbouey (54251)
 Haudonville (54255)
 Haussonville (54256)
 Hénaménil (54258)
 Herbéviller (54259)
 Hériménil (54260)
 Hoéville (54262)
 Hudiviller (54269)
 Igney (54271)
 Jolivet (54281)
 Juvrecourt (54285)
 Lachapelle (54287)
 Lamath (54292)
 Landécourt (54293)
 Laneuveville-aux-Bois (54297)
 Laronxe (54303)
 Leintrey (54308)
 Lorey (54324)
 Loromontzey (54325)
 Lunéville (54329)
 Magnières (54331)
 Maixe (54335)
 Manonviller (54349)
 Marainviller (54350)
 Mattexey (54356)
 Méhoncourt (54359)
 Merviller (54365)
 Mignéville (54368)
 Moncel-lès-Lunéville (54373)
 Montigny (54377)
 Montreux (54381)
 Mont-sur-Meurthe (54383)
 Moriviller (54386)
 Mouacourt (54388)
 Moyen (54393)
 Neufmaisons (54396)
 Neuviller-lès-Badonviller (54398)
 Nonhigny (54401)
 Ogéviller (54406)
 Parroy (54418)
 Parux (54419)
 Petitmont (54421)
 Pettonville (54422)
 Pexonne (54423)
 Pierre-Percée (54427)
 Raon-lès-Leau (54443)
 Raville-sur-Sânon (54445)
 Réchicourt-la-Petite (54446)
 Réclonville (54447)
 Rehainviller (54449)
 Reherrey (54450)
 Reillon (54452)
 Remenoville (54455)
 Remoncourt (54457)
 Repaix (54458)
 Romain (54461)
 Rozelieures (54467)
 Saint-Boingt (54471)
 Saint-Clément (54472)
 Sainte-Pôle (54484)
 Saint-Germain (54475)
 Saint-Mard (54479)
 Saint-Martin (54480)
 Saint-Maurice-aux-Forges (54481)
 Saint-Rémy-aux-Bois (54487)
 Saint-Sauveur (54488)
 Seranville (54501)
 Serres (54502)
 Sionviller (54507)
 Sommerviller (54509)
 Tanconville (54512)
 Thiaville-sur-Meurthe (54519)
 Thiébauménil (54520)
 Vacqueville (54539)
 Val-et-Châtillon (54540)
 Valhey (54541)
 Vallois (54543)
 Vathiménil (54550)
 Vaucourt (54551)
 Vaxainville (54555)
 Vého (54556)
 Velle-sur-Moselle (54559)
 Veney (54560)
 Vennezey (54561)
 Verdenal (54562)
 Vigneulles (54565)
 Villacourt (54567)
 Virecourt (54585)
 Vitrimont (54588)
 Xermaménil (54595)
 Xousse (54600)
 Xures (54601)

History

The arrondissement of Lunéville was created as part of the department Meurthe in 1800. Since 1871 it has been a part of the department Meurthe-et-Moselle.

As a result of the reorganisation of the cantons of France which came into effect in 2015, the borders of the cantons are no longer related to the borders of the arrondissements. The cantons of the arrondissement of Lunéville were, as of January 2015:

 Arracourt
 Baccarat
 Badonviller
 Bayon
 Blâmont
 Cirey-sur-Vezouze
 Gerbéviller
 Lunéville-Nord
 Lunéville-Sud

References

Luneville